Directional symmetry may refer to:

 Isotropy
 Directional statistics
 Directional symmetry (time series)